Ann Warren Turner (born December 10, 1945) is an American poet and children's author.

Published works

Poetry
 Tickle a Pickle illustrated by Karen Ann Weinhaus (Macmillan, 1986)
 Street Talk illustrated by Catherine Stock (Houghton Mifflin, 1986)
 Grass Songs illustrated by Barry Moser (Harcourt, 1993)
 A Moon for Seasons illustrated by Robert Noreika (Macmillan, 1994)
 The Christmas House illustrated by Nancy Edwards Calder (HarperCollins, 1994)
 Mississippi Mud illustrated by Robert J. Blake (HarperCollins, 1997)
 A Lion's Hunger illustrated by Maria Jimenez (Marshall Cavendish, 1998)
 Learning to Swim: a Memoir (Scholastic, 2000)

Picture books
 Dakota Dugout illustrated by Ronald Himler (Macmillan, 1985)
 Time of the Bison illustrated by Beth Peck (Macmillan, 1987)
 Nettie's Trip South illustrated by Ronald Himler (Macmillan, 1987)
 Hedgehog for Breakfast illustrated by Lisa McCue (Macmillan, 1989)
 Heron Street illustrated by Lisa Desimini (Harper & Row, 1989)
 Through Moon and Stars and Night Skies illustrated by James Hale (Harper & Row, 1990)
 Stars for Sarah illustrated by Mary Teichman (HarperCollins, 1991)
 Katie's Trunk illustrated by Ronald Himler (Macmillan, 1992)
 Rainflowers illustrated by Robert J. Blake (HarperCollins, 1992)
 Apple Valley Year illustrated by Sandi Wickersham Resnick (Macmillan, 1993)
 Sewing Quilts illustrated by Thomas B. Allen (Macmillan, 1994)
 Shaker Hearts illustrated by Wendell Minor (HarperCollins, 1997)
 Drummer Boy: Marching to the Civil War illustrated by Mark Hess (HarperCollins, 1998)
 Let's Be Animals illustrated by Richard E. Brown (HarperFestival, 1998)
 Angel Hide and Seek illustrated by Lois Ehlert (HarperCollins, 1998)
 Red Flower Goes West illustrated by Dennis Nolan (Hyperion, 1999)
 Secrets from the Dollhouse illustrated by Raúl Colón (HarperCollins, 2000)
 In the Heart illustrated by Sally Mavor (HarperCollins, 2001)
 Abe Lincoln Remembers illustrated by Wendell Minor (HarperCollins, 2001)
 When Mr. Jefferson Came to Philadelphia: What I Learned of Freedom, 1776 illustrated by Mark Hess (HarperCollins, 2003)
 Pumpkin Cat illustrated by Amy June Bates (Hyperion, 2004)
 Sitting Bull Remembers illustrated by Wendell Minor (HarperCollins, 2007)

Novels
 A Hunter Comes Home (Crown, 1980)
 The Way Home (Crown, 1982)
 Third Girl from the Left (Macmillan, 1986)
 Grasshopper Summer (Macmillan, 1989)
 Rosemary's Witch (HarperCollins, 1991)
 Dust for Dinner illustrated by Robert Barrett (HarperCollins, 1995)
 One Brave Summer (HarperCollins, 1995)
 Elfsong (Harcourt, 1995)
 Finding Walter (Harcourt, 1997)
 The Girl Who Chased Away Sorrow: The Diary of Sarah Nita, a Navajo Girl (Scholastic, 1999)
 Love Thy Neighbor: The Tory Diary of Prudence Emerson (Scholastic, 2003)
 Maïa of Thebes: 1463 B.C. (Scholastic, 2005)
 Hard Hit (Scholastic, 2006)
 Father of Lies (HarperTeen, 2011)

Awards
1967: first prize, The Atlantic Monthly college creative writing contest
1991: first prize, National Council for the Social Studies, Through Moon and Stars and Night Skies

References

External links
http://www.worldcat.org/identities/lccn-n80-25955

1945 births
Living people
Writers from Northampton, Massachusetts
American children's writers
20th-century American poets
American women poets
American women children's writers
20th-century American women writers
21st-century American women writers
Bates College alumni